The Boeing F2B was a biplane fighter aircraft of the United States Navy in the 1920s, familiar to aviation enthusiasts of the era as the craft of the Three Sea Hawks aerobatic flying team, famous for its tied-together formation flying.

Design and development

Initially the Boeing Model 69, it was inspired by the results of tests on the FB-6, which was powered by a Pratt & Whitney R-1340B Wasp radial engine. Boeing set out to use this engine in a fighter designed specifically for carrier operations, using the same welded-tubing fuselage and wooden-frame wings as for the Model 15, and adding a large spinner to reduce air drag around the engine (this was dropped in production). Armament was either two  machine guns, or one .30 in and one ; the lower wing had attachments for up to four  bombs, plus a fifth could be hung from the fuselage.

Operational history
First flight of the F2B prototype was November 3, 1926. In addition to omission of the large streamlined spinner cap, the production versions also had a balanced rudder. Delivery began on January 20, 1928, with some assigned to fighter squadron VF-1B and others to bomber squadron VF-2B, both operating from the carrier . Although the Navy did not order any more F2Bs, Boeing built two more, as Model 69Bs, exporting one to Brazil and the other to Japan.

U.S. Navy flight demonstration team

In 1927, Lt. D. W. "Tommy" Tomlinson CO of VF-2B, created the first U.S. Naval aerobatic team. Drawing from VB-2B squadron at Naval Air Station North Island, San Diego, the team used three Boeing F2B-1 fighters. Its first unofficial demonstration in January 1928 at San Francisco gave rise to a popular nickname: "Suicide Trio" although officially the team was called "Three Sea Hawks". The first public performance as an official team representing the Navy was between September 8 and 16, during National Air Races week at Mines Field (now Los Angeles International Airport). The Boeing F2B-1 was unable to fly inverted without the engine quitting; consequently, Lt. Tomlinson modified the carburetors to permit brief inverted flight. At the end of 1929, the Three Sea Hawks team is disbanded when its VB-2B pilots were reassigned.

Variants
XF2B-1(Model 69) One prototype serial number A7385
F2B-1(Model 69) Single-seat fighter biplane for the U.S. Navy, serial numbers A7424 to A7455
Model 69B Two aircraft, generally similar to the F2B-1, one each to Brazil and Japan.

Operators

Brazilian Naval Aviation

Imperial Japanese Navy Air Service

United States Navy

Specifications (F2B-1)

See also

References

Notes

Bibliography

Eden, Paul and Sophn Moeng. The Complete Encyclopedia of World Aircraft. London: Amber Books Ltd., 2002. .
Jones, Lloyd S. U.S. Naval Fighters. Fallbrook CA: Aero Publishers, 1977. .
Swanborough, Gordon and Peter M. Bowers. United States Navy Aircraft Since 1911. Annapolis, MD: Naval Institute Press, 1976. .

External links

Boeing F2B-1  Archived version as of 10 November 2016

F2B
Boeing F2B
Single-engined tractor aircraft
Biplanes
Carrier-based aircraft
Aircraft first flown in 1926